William Fernando da Silva (born 20 November 1986), known simply as William da Silva or William, is a Brazilian professional footballer who plays as a defensive midfielder for CSA. He also holds Mexican citizenship.

Career
Da Silva began his career Palmeiras, signing a five-year contract with the club in 2003. He made his professional debut for Palmeiras in a 0–1 home defeat to Grêmio in the Campeonato Brasileiro on 28 May 2006. Since 2008 he had been loaned out to other Brazilian clubs. His contract was also extended until June 2011. It was renewed again in 2010. He was injured in June and missed the rest of the season.

In July 2012, William moved to Série B team Joinville Esporte Clube on a free transfer. The following year, William joined Busan IPark of South Korea. He made his debut in a 2–2 draw against Gangwon FC on 3 March 2013, and scored his first goal against FC Seoul two weeks later.

In 2014, da Silva signed with Mexican side Quéretaro. While at Querétaro he would reach the finals of the 2015 Clausura tournament, finishing runners-up to Santos Laguna.

On 9 December 2015, it was announced that da Silva was sold to Club América, signing a three-year contract. He called the move to América "one of the most important challenges of my career", and a "dream realized".

Honours
São Paulo
Campeonato Paulista: 2021

References

External links

 Guardian Stats Centre
 sambafoot
 CBF
 palmeiras.globo.com
 zerozero.pt

Brazilian footballers
Brazilian expatriate footballers
Clube Atlético Juventus players
Sport Club Corinthians Paulista players
Sociedade Esportiva Palmeiras players
Clube Náutico Capibaribe players
Ipatinga Futebol Clube players
Joinville Esporte Clube players
Busan IPark players
Querétaro F.C. footballers
Club América footballers
Deportivo Toluca F.C. players
São Paulo FC players
Centro Sportivo Alagoano players
Campeonato Brasileiro Série A players
Campeonato Brasileiro Série B players
K League 1 players
Liga MX players
Expatriate footballers in South Korea
Brazilian expatriate sportspeople in South Korea
Expatriate footballers in Mexico
Brazilian expatriate sportspeople in Mexico
Naturalized citizens of Mexico
1986 births
Living people
Association football midfielders
Footballers from São Paulo